Karl August "Charles" Luther (8 August 1885 – 24 January 1962) was a Swedish sprinter who won a silver medal in the 4 × 100 m relay at the 1912 Summer Olympics. He failed to reach the finals of individual 100 m and 200 m events.

References

External links

1885 births
1962 deaths
Swedish male sprinters
Olympic silver medalists for Sweden
Athletes (track and field) at the 1912 Summer Olympics
Olympic athletes of Sweden
Medalists at the 1912 Summer Olympics
Athletes from Gothenburg
Olympic silver medalists in athletics (track and field)
20th-century Swedish people